Hare and Dunhog Mosses is a nature reserve near Selkirk, in the Scottish Borders area of Scotland, in the former Selkirkshire.

Locations
 Hare Moss
 Dunhog Moss

See also
List of Sites of Special Scientific Interest in Berwickshire and Roxburgh
List of Sites of Special Scientific Interest in Tweeddale and Ettrick and Lauderdale
List of places in the Scottish Borders
List of places in Scotland

External links

Scottish Wildlife Trust: Hare and Dunhog Mosses
Scottish Wildlife Trust: Scottish Borders leaflet

Nature reserves in Scotland
Protected areas in the Scottish Borders